Governor Allen may refer to:

Charles Herbert Allen (1848–1934), Civil Governor of Puerto Rico
Frank G. Allen (1874–1950), Governor of Massachusetts
George Allen (American politician) (born 1952), Governor of Virginia
Henry Justin Allen (1868–1950), Governor of Kansas
Henry Watkins Allen (1820–1866), Governor of Louisiana
Oscar K. Allen (1882–1936), Governor of Louisiana
Philip Allen (Rhode Island politician) (1785–1865), Governor of Rhode Island
William Allen (governor) (1803–1879), Governor of Ohio
Milton Allen (1888–1981), Governor of Saint Christopher-Nevis-Anguilla

See also
William Allain (1928–2013), Governor of Mississippi
Colin Allan (1921–1993), 7th Governor of the Solomon Islands and 19th Governor of the Seychelles
Roger Allin (1848–1936), Governor of North Dakota